Bistrica is a village situated in Petrovac na Mlavi municipality, Braničevo District in Serbia.

References

Populated places in Braničevo District
Spatial Cultural-Historical Units of Great Importance